is a detective novel by Keigo Higashino. It was serialized in Weekly Gendai from 16 September 2006 to 15 September 2007 and was published into one tankōbon volume by Kodansha on 5 March 2008. The novel was published in paperback format by Kodansha on 15 April 2011.

The novel was adapted into a Japanese television drama in 2008 starring Kazunari Ninomiya, Ryo Nishikido, and Erika Toda. With the opening theme "Beautiful days" by Arashi and the insert song "Orion" by Mika Nakashima, the drama series began on 17 October 2008.

Plot
During their childhood days, the Ariake siblings — Kōichi, Taisuke, and Shizuna lived peacefully with their parents who owned a western restaurant named after their family name that specializes in hayashi rice. One day in the night, the siblings ran away from home to watch a meteor, just to later find out that their parents were killed while they were gone. The case remained unsolved due to lack of evidence and witnesses; only Taisuke has barely seen a suspect. Leaving a great impact to the lives of the sibling, they made a promise to find the killer and kill him themselves. 14 years later, the sibling who are now adults, suddenly find a clue leading to the killer, but they will have to find proofs and motives before the case expired.

Cast
Kazunari Ninomiya as 
Ryusei Saito as young Koichi
Kōichi is the eldest of the Ariake sibling; he is 26 years old in the present time. He was the first one to discover his parents' dead bodies. Has great responsibility and dearly treasured his siblings. As the eldest son, he was expected to continue his father's restaurant, and has attended a cooking school, although according to him, it's "a waste of time." Kōichi is now working at "George Clooney," a curry house owned by his benefactor and lives there as well. 
Ryo Nishikido as 
Issei Kakazu as young Taisuke
Taisuke is the middle child and Kōichi's only blood-related brother; he is  24 years old in the present time. Taisuke is the only person who has barely seen a suspect. He is now working at adult DVD store "Tommy Lee George," owned by his benefactor as well. He is currently living at Shizuna's apartment.
Erika Toda as 
Sea Kumada as young Shizuna
Shizuna, or nicknamed "Shii" by her brothers, is the last child and the only daughter; she is 21 years old in the present time. Unknowingly to her, Shizuna has no blood relation to her brothers, but is an illegitimate child from her mother's previous affair with a man named "Yazaki."
Jun Kaname as 
Yukinari is the only son and the heir of Togami western restaurant chain who is in attempt to recreate the original taste of hayashi rice. He is 29 years old.
Toshinori Omi as 
George is the benefactor and a father figure of the Ariake sibling; he owned the orphan facility where the siblings spent their childhood at, a curry house, and an adult DVD store. 
Akira Emoto as  
Yukinari's father and the owner of Togami western restaurant chain.
Ryo as 
Mother of the Ariake siblings. She was a hostess and was pregnant with one of her customer Yazaki before she met her current husband.
Susumu Terajima as 
Father of the Ariake siblings and owner of Ariake western restaurant. The store is popular for its hayashi rice that made with secret recipe.
Tomokazu Miura as 
The police who is in charge of Ariake's murder case. 
Osamu Shitara as 
Another police who is in charge of Ariake's murder case. When drunk, he acts like an onee.
Kenta Kiritani as 
The boss at Shizuna's former office. He loves to put post-it notes on everything. He calls Shizuna "boring," but is actually has crush on her although his pride won't let him say it.
Mika Nakashima as 
A mysterious girl with no eyebrows who often shows up at George Clooney; nobody knows her name because she simply never introduces herself. She calls Kōichi "Axel" and is attracted to him. She acts as the comic relief of the series.

Guests
 Taiyo Sugiura as Kazuya Saigō (ep 1,4)
 Shoko Ikezu as Miwa Katsuragi (ep 1)
 Tomiyuki Kunihiro as Nobuo Yazaki (ep 3,6)
 Seminosuke Murasugi as Katsuo Tsukimura (ep 3-5,8)
 Kazuaki Hankai as Teranishi (ep 3,6)
 David Ito as Takehiro Sawai (ep 4)
 Eri Tokunaga as Chiemi (ep 4)
 Yumi Aso as Toko Yazaki (ep 5,6)
 Aiko Morishita as Kimiko Togami (ep 5-10)
 Shoichiro Tanigawa as a restaurant manager (ep 5)
 Kiyohiko Ichihara as a shopkeeper (ep 5)
 Akio Kaneda as chief clerk (ep 7)
 Yusuke Shoji as Tsujimura (ep 7)

Staff
Script: Kankurō Kudō
Soundtrack: 
Producer: , 
Director: ,

Episodes

It was broadcast in the United States, Canada, and Puerto Rico through TV Japan, US affiliate of NHK, every Saturday from 10 October 2009.

References

External links

Weekly Ratings 

Kin'yō Dorama
2008 Japanese television series debuts
2008 Japanese television series endings
Television shows written by Kankurō Kudō
Television shows based on Japanese novels